Franklin or Frank Hansen may refer to:

Frank Hansen (Australian footballer) (1884–1975), Australian rules full-forward
Franklin Hansen (1897–1982), American Oscar-winning film sound engineer
Frank Hansen (politician) (1913–1991), American legislator in Washington state
Frank Hansen (rower) (born 1945), Norwegian Olympic medalist
Frank Hansen (bobsleigh) (born 1952), American 1984 Olympian
Frank Hansen (footballer, born 1983), Danish defender

See also
Francis Hanson (1807–1873), American Episcopal missionary to China
Frank H. Hanson (1884–1940), American politician in Wisconsin
Frank Hanson (born 1965), Ghanaian Chief of Naval Staff